Tejen (older spellings: Tedzhen, Tejend, Tejent) is an oasis city in the Karakum Desert, in Ahal Province of Turkmenistan. It lies along the M37 highway, between Dushak and Mary,  by road southeast of Ashgabat. It has a population of approximately 52,000. To the east is the larger oasis of Mary.

Etymology
The meaning of tejen is unclear.  Atanyyazov explained, ...The meaning of this ancient name is not clear...Barthold noted that this name was also used in the form of Tuzhen in the X-XI centuries...Vambery derived it from the words tei-e hend (tei-e kent, tei— “down”, kent - “village”, “city”) and derived from that “downstream of the city,” “downstream of the city,” or “downstream of the river". He writes that he may have understood the meaning of the word as "city in the desert"...the name of the village along the Gerrud River is mentioned...This name also means "the foot of the city"...As Barthold rightly points out, this name is not the name of the first river, but the name of the county, village, or land, for the river itself is in its upper reaches Hererrud (Herat-rud, i.e., the "Herat River"), and below Sarahs is Khushk-rud, i.e., it was known as the "Waterless River"...In Persian khushk means "dry", "shroud", rud - "river". This name is a characteristic sign of the river, that is, it is associated with the cutting off of its water in the summer.

History
In 1883 it was occupied by General Komarov during the Russian conquest of Turkestan.
In 1916, when the Turkmens participated in a revolt against the Russians, Tejen was a hotbed of activity.

Tejen was downgraded from a city with district status to a city in a district on 9 November 2022 by parliamentary decree.

Economy
Tejen is known for its melon production, and contains numerous textile factories. The city features one hotel, the Hotel Tejen. Tejen is the site of the $240 million Tejen Carbamide (urea) Plant, inaugurated on March 18, 2005, with a design capacity of 350,000 tonnes of urea per year.  It is also known for its narcotics, which are known locally as "Tejen tea".

Government installations
A prison is located in Tejen.

Landmarks
The city contains the Charman Ahun Mosque and the Hotel Tejen.

Wildlife
Historical records indicate that the Caspian tiger was found in this region.

Transport 
It is a stop on the Trans-Caspian railway, and in the 1996 a new rail line via Sarahs to Mashhad in Iran was opened. Tejen is located on the M37 highway, and the P-7 highway leads south from Tejen to Sarahs and onward to Iran.

See also 
 Railway stations in Turkmenistan

References 

Populated places in Ahal Region
Oases of Turkmenistan